Mike Fox is an American retired college baseball coach. Fox was the North Carolina head baseball coach for 22 seasons and is considered one of the school's most successful coaches, having led the Tar Heels to seven College World Series appearances, including four consecutive from 2006 to 2009. Over his 37-year head coaching career, he compiled a 1,487–547–5 record (.731 winning percentage). Fox was named to the North Carolina Sports Hall of Fame in 2017.

Playing career
Fox played second base for the Tar Heels from 1976–1978. As a senior, he hit .277, tied for the team lead with six home runs. He led the Tar Heels to the 1978 College World Series and was named a member of the CWS All-Tournament Team.  Fox also played on the UNC Junior Varsity Basketball team under Eddie Fogler in the 1975 and '76 seasons.

Fox played independent professional baseball for a year after graduating from Carolina before returning to his alma mater as a graduate assistant in 1979.

Coaching career

North Carolina Wesleyan
Fox coached at North Carolina Wesleyan from 1983 until 1998. Fox led the Battling Bishops to eight trips to the Division III College World Series, and in 1989, his team won the NCAA Division III College World Series. 

Fox's career record of 539-141-4 at N.C. Wesleyan ranked second in career winning percentage (.791) among all active Division III head coaches at the time of his return to Carolina.

University of North Carolina
Mike Fox was hired as head coach of the North Carolina Tar Heels baseball team on May 7, 1998, becoming the 24th head baseball coach in the history of the school, and only its third coach since 1947. In 2006 and 2007, he led North Carolina to back-to-back 2nd-place finishes at the College World Series. Fox would lead Carolina to another five College World Series appearances in 2008, 2009, 2011, 2013, and 2018. Fox's teams in 2007, 2013 and 2018 won ACC championships. In 2008, he was named the National Coach of the Year by Baseball America,  and in 2018, he was named ACC Coach of the Year. On August 7, 2020, Mike Fox retired and Scott Forbes, an assistant on Fox's staff for 19 seasons was named his successor. After 22 seasons, Fox retired as the winningest coach in Carolina Baseball history, with a record of 948-406-1.

Personal
Fox attended East Mecklenburg High School in Charlotte, North Carolina. He currently lives in Chapel Hill with his wife Cheryl. Mike has a son, Matthew (36), daughter Morgan (32), son-in-law Tyler (33) and three grandchildren.

Head coaching record

See also
List of college baseball coaches with 1,100 wins

References

External links
 North Carolina profile

Year of birth missing (living people)
Living people
North Carolina Tar Heels baseball coaches
North Carolina Tar Heels baseball players
North Carolina Wesleyan Battling Bishops baseball coaches
Baseball players from Charlotte, North Carolina